, often abbreviated PDAS, is a Japanese space tourism company based in Nagoya founded in 2007 by Shuji Ogawa. The "PD" in the company's name stands for "pulse detonation". PDAS is developing a suborbital spaceplane to carry two pilots and six passengers using a hybrid of jet and rocket power. Initial tickets are planned for ¥ 14,000,000 (about $125,000 USD as of April 2017) eventually lowering to ¥400,000 (about $3,600).

PDAS plans to develop a hybrid engine that produces jet and rocket thrust, using pulse detonation jet and pulse combustion rocket modes. To reduce the cost of development and keep the vehicle low-cost, PDAS plans to use commercially available hardware, instead of custom-designed parts. H.I.S. and ANA own 10% and 7% of the company, respectively.

See also

 Blue Origin
 Interstellar Technologies, a Japanese rocket startup
 Virgin Galactic

References

External links

Airlines established in 2007
Transport companies established in 2007
Vehicle manufacturing companies established in 2007
Japanese companies established in 2007
Companies based in Nagoya
Travel and holiday companies of Japan
Commercial spaceflight
Human spaceflight programs
Private spaceflight companies
Space tourism
Aerospace companies of Japan